The Symphony No. 1 in G minor by Russian composer Vasily Kalinnikov was written from 1894 to 1895 and first published in 1900. The symphony is dedicated to Russian music critic and teacher Semyon Kruglikov.

History

Background
After contracting tuberculosis in 1893 while serving as conductor of the Maly Theatre in Moscow, Kalinnikov moved to Yalta for a more salubrious climate. It was there that he composed his first symphony. Upon completion in 1895, the symphony's score was sent to its dedicatee , who was Kalinnikov's teacher and financial benefactor. Kruglikov recommended the work to the country's leading conductors. The score was also sent to Nikolai Rimsky-Korsakov, who was less supportive of the score, particularly in its technical aspects, however was overall impressed by the composition.

Premiere
The symphony was premiered in 1897 at the Russian Music Society in Kiev. It was conducted by Alexander Vinogradsky and was received well by the audience, who gave the second and third movements an encore. The success of the premiere was followed by performances in Vienna, Paris, London, Berlin, and Moscow.

Instrumentation 
The symphony is scored for:

Woodwinds
piccolo
2 flutes
2 oboes
cor anglais
2 clarinets
2 bassoons

Brass
4 horns
2 trumpets
3 trombones
tuba

Percussion
timpani
triangle

Strings
harp
violins I, II
violas
cellos
double basses

Form
The symphony is in four movements:

The first movement is in sonata form and opens with the main theme played in unison strings. The second theme is also presented by the strings, with woodwinds in the background. The development section is contrapuntal in nature, reminiscent of the fugues Kalinnikov composed in the 1880s. The second movement opens with an ostinato of the harp and first violins that leads into a solo for the cor anglais with the violas. Then the movement's main theme is played by the oboe to pizzicato strings. The third movement, a scherzo, contains Russian folk-music influences and melodies and includes a trio played in the woodwinds. The Finale opens with the first movement's main theme before revisiting and transforming themes from all previous movements as well as incorporating new themes derived from old ones. The symphony concludes with a triumphal ending played by the full orchestra. A typical performance lasts around 40 minutes.

Recordings
The following is a list of recordings of the work, listing year, orchestra, and conductor:
 1941: Indianapolis Symphony Orchestra, Fabien Sevitzky
 1943: NBC Symphony Orchestra, Arturo Toscanini
 1951: Czech Philharmonic, Hermann Scherchen
 1952–55: Moscow Philharmonic, Natan Rakhlin
 1975: USSR State Symphony Orchestra, Evgeny Svetlanov 
 1960: Moscow Philharmonic, Kirill Kondrashin
 1987: Royal Scottish National Orchestra, Neeme Järvi
 1993 (Finale only): United States Marine Band, Timothy Foley
 1994: National Symphony Orchestra of Ukraine, Theodore Kuchar
 2011: Malaysian Philharmonic Orchestra, Kees Bakels

See also
 Symphony No. 2 (Kalinnikov)

References

External links
 

Kalinnikov
1895 compositions
Compositions in G minor
Compositions by Vasily Kalinnikov